Middlesex West was a federal electoral district represented in the House of Commons of Canada from 1867 to 1968. It was located in the province of Ontario. It was created by the British North America Act of 1867 which divided the County of Middlesex into three ridings: Middlesex North, Middlesex West and Middlesex East.

The West Riding initially consisted of the Townships of Delaware, Caradoc, Metcalfe, Mosa and Ekfrid, and the Village of Strathroy.

In 1882, it was redefined to include the townships of Adelaide, Euphemia, the villages of Glencoe, Newbury and Wardsville, and to exclude the township of Carradoc.

In 1903, it was redefined to consist of the townships of Caradoc, Delaware, Ekfrid, Metcalfe and Mosa, the town of Strathroy, and the villages of Glencoe, Newbury and Wardsville.

In 1914, it was redefined to consist of the townships of Adelaide, Lobo, Delaware, Caradoc, Metcalfe, Mosa, Ekfrid, McGillivray, Williams East and Williams West, the towns of Park Hill and Strathroy, and the villages of Ailsa Craig, Glencoe, Newbury and Wardsville.

In 1924, it was defined as consisting of the part of the county of Middlesex lying west of and including the townships of McGillivray, Williams East, Lobo and Delaware.

In 1947, it was redefined to consist of the county of Middlesex, excluding the townships of North Dorchester, London, West Nissouri and Westminster.

In 1952, it was redefined to consist of the county of Middlesex excluding the townships of North Dorchester, London, West Nissouri, Westminster, and the eastern part of the township of London.

The electoral district was abolished in 1966 when it was redistributed between Huron, London West and Middlesex ridings.

Members of Parliament

This riding elected the following members of the House of Commons of Canada:

Election results

|}

|}

|}

|}

|}

On election being declared void, October 1883:
 

|}

|}

On Mr. Roome being unseated on petition:
 

|}

|}

|}

|}

|}

|}

On Mr. Calvert being appointed member of the National Transcontinental Railway Commission, 21 October 1909:
 

|}

|}

|}

|}

|}

On Mr. Elliott being appointed Minister of Labour, 8 March 1926:  
 

|}

|}

On Mr. Elliott being appointed Minister of Public Works, 25 October 1926:
 

|}

|}

|}

|}

|}

|}

|}

|}

|}

|}

|}

|}

See also 

 List of Canadian federal electoral districts
 Past Canadian electoral districts

External links 
 Parliamentary website

Former federal electoral districts of Ontario